The second Wever-Croes cabinet is the current cabinet of Aruba. It was installed on 20 September 2021 by Deputy Governor Yvonne Laclé-Dirksz. The cabinet is formed by a coalition government of the center-left political parties People's Electoral Movement (MEP) and RAIZ, and is led by Prime Minister Evelyn Wever-Croes.

Formation 
The 2021 general election resulted in a Parliament in which none of the elected parties holds an absolute majority. As the largest party in Parliament, MEP (9 seats) was therefore given the initiative to form a coalition government. The party stated that it was willing to form a coalition with any other party, except the Aruban People's Party (AVP).

On 8 July 2021, MEP and RAIZ (2 seats) signed a declaration of intent to form a coalition government. Throughout the formation, the aspiring coalition parties organized more than 100 meetings with various stakeholders and interest groups. On 19 August, a coalition agreement was signed by the two parties. The cabinet was installed on 20 September.

Composition 
The second Wever-Croes cabinet consists of eight ministers. Six ministries went to MEP, and two to RAIZ. The position of Minister Plenipotentiary also went to MEP. Four ministers from the previous cabinet were given a position in the second Wever-Croes cabinet: Evelyn Wever-Croes, Xiomara Maduro, Dangui Oduber and Glenbert Croes. Due to rearrangements, the division of portfolios among the ministers was slightly altered.

References 

Wever-Croes 2
Cabinets established in 2021
Coalition governments